Kamarkundu is a railway station at the crossing of the Howrah–Bishnupur and the Howrah–Bardhaman chord lines. It serves Kamarkundu in Hooghly district in the Indian state of West Bengal.

Overview
This is a rich agricultural area with several cold storages.

History
The Howrah–Tarakeswar line was opened in 1885 and the Howrah–Bardhaman chord line in 1917. It is part of Kolkata Suburban Railway system.

Station oddity
At Kamarkundu, the Sheoraphuli–Bishnupur branch line goes above the Howrah–Bardhaman chord. Since the lines are at two levels, trains cannot switch routes. Platforms are at two levels.

Major Trains
Sealdah - Alipurduar Kanchan Kanya Express
Howrah–Rampurhat Express
Kolkata–Jammu Tawi Express

References

External links
 Trains at Kamarkundu – other than EMU/ locals

Railway stations in Hooghly district
Railway stations in India opened in 1885
Howrah railway division
Kolkata Suburban Railway stations